The 1962 Auckland City mayoral election was part of the New Zealand local elections held that same year. In 1962, elections were held for the Mayor of Auckland plus other local government positions including twenty-one city councillors. The polling was conducted using the standard first-past-the-post electoral method.

Background
Incumbent Mayor Dove-Myer Robinson was re-elected against past president of the Auckland Chamber of Commerce Edgar Faber, who despite possessing a low public profile and comparative lack of local body experience did better than expected. The election also saw the Labour Party split from the Civic Reform ticket. To assist in publicity it was thought that the Labour ticket should include a mayoral candidate as well. However, Watt ruled himself out stating he felt he could make a greater contribution to the city's development by remaining in national politics and that he wished to do so by serving in the cabinet of the next Labour government.

Faber was a reluctant candidate from the beginning, who was only persuaded to run for the mayoralty after a group of Citizens & Ratepayers (C&R) councillors (Fred de Malmanche, Charlie Passmore and Reg Savory) told him exaggerated stories of Robinson's personal conduct and his behaviour during council business. During the campaign Faber began to regret his candidacy and when it began to adversely affect his health he planned to withdraw from the contest, but the C&R trio were insistent that he stay in the race. Shortly after the election ended Faber discovered that he was in fact dying of cancer and confided to Robinson that the C&R councillors had used him against Robinson for "purely mercenary ends".

Mayoralty results

Councillor results

References

Notes

Mayoral elections in Auckland
1962 elections in New Zealand
Politics of the Auckland Region
1960s in Auckland
October 1962 events in New Zealand